The Prof. Dr. Ir. Soedijatmo Toll Road, also commonly spelled as Prof. Dr. Ir. Sedyatmo Toll Road, is a toll road in Northern Jakarta that connects the Soekarno–Hatta International Airport with the city of Jakarta in Indonesia. Completed in 1985 and operated by Jasa Marga, the toll road is named after , an Indonesian civil engineer.

Exit and gates

Route

Flood
In 2008, nearly 1,000 flights were delayed or diverted and 259 were cancelled after heavy rainfall flooded a three-kilometer stretch of the toll road. In 2012, the Jakarta governor guaranteed that the toll road will not be flooded again due to the operation of three screw pumps with a total capacity of draining 12 cubic meters of water per second which cover water drainage canals across a total area of 385 hectares.

References

External links
Jasa Marga website

Toll roads in Indonesia
Roads of Jakarta
Soekarno–Hatta International Airport